Draco abbreviatus, the Singapore flying dragon, is a species of agamid lizard. It is found in Singapore and Malaysia.

References

Draco (genus)
Reptiles of Malaysia
Reptiles of Singapore
Reptiles described in 1827
Taxa named by Thomas Hardwicke
Taxa named by John Edward Gray